The Brussels Metro is a rapid transit system serving a large part of the Brussels-Capital Region of Belgium. It consists of four conventional metro lines and three premetro lines. The premetro network consists of three tram lines (T3, T4, and T7) that partly travel over underground sections that were intended to be eventually converted into metro lines. Underground stations in the premetro network use the same design as metro stations. There are a total of 69 metro and premetro stations as of 2011.

Most of the common section of the first two metro lines (between De Brouckère metro station and Schuman station) was inaugurated on 17 December 1969 as premetro tramways, converted in 1976 to the first two metro lines, then considered as one line with two branches, between De Brouckère and Tomberg and De Brouckère and Beaulieu. The Brussels Metro is administered by the Brussels Intercommunal Transport Company (STIB/MIVB). In 2011, it was used for 125.8 million journeys,  and it was used for 138.3 million journeys in 2012. It is also an important means of transport, connecting with six railway stations of the National Railway Company of Belgium (NMBS/SNCB), and many tram and bus stops operated by STIB/MIVB, and with Flemish De Lijn and Walloon TEC bus stops.

On 22 March 2016, Maelbeek metro station was bombed, killing about 20 people and injuring 106. The Islamic State of Iraq and the Levant (ISIL) claimed responsibility.

History

Early history
The first underground tramway (or premetro) line was built between 1965 and 1969, from Schuman to De Brouckère. In 1970, a second line was opened, between Madou and Porte de Namur/Naamsepoort. An underground station at Diamant was opened in 1972 and the Greater Ring line was extended from Diamant to Boileau in 1975. This underground tramway section has not been developed further, and it is used by tramway lines 7 and 25. Rogier station was inaugurated in 1974.

Opening and extensions
On 20 September 1976, the first metro line opened. One branch went from De Brouckère to Beaulieu (in Auderghem), and the other one linked De Brouckère with Tomberg (in Woluwe-Saint-Lambert). The same year, the North–South Axis (premetro) was opened between the North Station and Lemonnier. In 1977, two new stations were built; Sainte-Catherine/Sint-Katelijne, which replaced De Brouckère as the last western stop in the City of Brussels, and Demey, which replaced Beaulieu as the last stop of the southern branch.

The next extension was the opening of stations in Molenbeek-Saint-Jean (Beekkant, the new terminus, Etangs Noirs/Zwarte Vijvers and Comte de Flandre/Graaf van Vlaanderen). In 1982, line 1 was split into line 1A from Bockstael (in Laeken, a former municipality now merged with the City of Brussels) to Demey (Auderghem) and line 1B from Saint-Guidon/Sint-Guido (in Anderlecht) to Alma (at the Université catholique de Louvain (UCLouvain) campus in Woluwe-Saint-Lambert). Three years later, line 1A was extended to Heysel/Heizel (near the site of the 1958 World's Fair and the Heysel Stadium) at one end and to Herrmann-Debroux at the other. That year also saw the opening of Veeweyde/Veeweide on line 1B, and Louise/Louiza on the premetro line under the Small Ring (from Louise/Louiza to Rogier).

This line was extended to Simonis the next year and opened as metro line 2 in 1988, from Simonis to Gare du Midi/Zuidstation (Brussels-South Station). Crainhem/Kraainem and Stockel/Stokkel also opened that year on line 1B. At the other end of this line, Bizet opened in 1992. It was then the turn of line 2 to reach Clemenceau in 1993. The premetro section known as the North–South Axis, sometimes referred to as line 3, was extended to Albert that year with five new premetro stations (South Station, Porte de Hal/Hallepoort, Parvis de Saint-Gilles/Sint-Gillis Voorplein, Horta and Albert).

In 1998, Roi Baudouin/King Boudewijn opened on line 1A. Four stations opened in 2003 on line 1B; La Roue/Het Rad, CERIA/COOVI, Eddy Merckx, and Erasme/Erasmus. With the opening of Delacroix in September 2006, line 2 was extended beyond Clemenceau. A further extension to Gare de l'Ouest/Weststation in April 2009 closed the loop of line 2 and led to a major restructuring of metro service.

The Brussels Metro system is complemented by an S-train network serving the broader metropolitan region and opened in late 2015.

22 March 2016 bombings in Maelbeek

On 22 March 2016, the Islamic State bombed Maalbeek/Maelbeek metro station in a terrorist attack that coincided with another bomb attack at Brussels Airport. The bombing at Maelbeek station killed twenty people. The incident prompted the temporary closure of the entire system, and a major reduction in service for several weeks. A fundamental review of security procedures on the metro is underway as of 2016.

Network map

Lines and stations

The premetro lines are powered (like the ground-level tram lines) by overhead lines at 600 V DC; the conventional metro lines use instead an elevated third rail at 900 V DC. They all use standard gauge. Conventional metro platforms are "high platforms", built flush with the floor of the metro compartments; premetro platforms are the same height, but with a lowered section at least as long as the longest tram, for compatibility with tramways which must be able to take passengers from the sidewalk of a street, or even from the street floor itself. Upgrading a line from premetro to metro service includes, among others, raising the whole platform to metro height and replacing the overhead line by a third rail power supply .

Metro
There are four conventional metro lines and, 59 stations (not including premetro stations). Most stations are underground, although some on lines 5 and 6 are at ground level. On 4 April 2009, the connection at Gare de l'Ouest/Weststation that enables line 2 to form a circular line was put into service. As a consequence, the metro network was significantly reorganised. The development plan for this change and related tram and bus network changes was approved by the Brussels-Capital Region in July 2005.

As of 4 April 2009, the four lines are as follows: 
 Line 1 from Gare de l'Ouest/Weststation to the west to Stockel/Stokkel at the east end (formerly part of line 1B);
 Line 2 is a loop starting and ending in Simonis via the eastern side of the Small Ring (an extension of former line 2 from Delacroix north-bound to Simonis);
 Line 5 from Erasme/Erasmus to the south-west to Herrmann-Debroux to the south-east (combines parts of former lines 1A and 1B);
 Line 6 from Roi Baudouin/Koning Boudewijn to the north-west to Simonis (including the loop of the newly extended line 2; combines the former line 2, the new connection, and a branch of the former line 1A).

Premetro

Line 3 and Line 4 are tram lines using the North–South Axis tunnel which crosses the city centre from Brussels-North via Brussels-South to Albert. Line 3 runs from Churchill in the south to Esplanade in the north. Line 4 runs from Brussels-North to the Stalle car park in the south. This North–South Axis is being upgraded to metro service; works have begun in 2019, including north-eastward prolongation of the metro tunnel, and the transition to conventional metro is foreseen for 2024.

Line 7 is the main line of the Greater Ring, replacing Tram 23 and Tram 24 as of 14 March 2011. It services the Heysel/Heizel, runs under Laeken Park and then via the Greater Ring to the terminus of Line 3 to terminate one stop later at Vanderkindere for connections to tram lines 3, 4 and 92. The somewhat shorter  also runs the Greater Ring premetro, but with different termini at both ends.

Ticketing
MoBIB is the STIB/MIVB electronic smart card, introduced in 2007, replacing the discontinued paper tickets. It uses contactless technology based on the Calypso system originally developed for Paris and is in some ways similar e.g. to the London's Oyster card. All metro stations, buses and trams have MoBIB readers.

There is a very wide range of ticket shares to meet different needs. The cost of travel with STIB/MIVB means of transport (metro, tram and bus) is calculated per hour. As long as the journey does not exceed one hour after the first validation of the ticket, it is possible, for example, to switch from a bus to a metro train within the STIB/MIVB network without paying a second time (i.e. a new validation is required but will not be charged). Each trip has a different cost depending on the type of support purchased. Passengers can purchase monthly passes, yearly passes, 1 and 10-trip tickets and daily and 3-day passes. These can be bought over the Internet, but require customers to have a smart card reader. GO vending machines accept coins, local and international chip and PIN credit and debit cards. 

Moreover, a complimentary interticketing system means that a combined STIB/MIVB ticket holder can also use the train network operated by NMBS/SNCB and/or long-distance buses and commuter services operated by De Lijn or TEC, depending on the option. With this ticket, a single journey can include multiple stages across the different modes of transport and networks.

following a successful trial in 2019, and expedited by the COVID-19 pandemic, it is now possible to pay for STIB/MIVB journies using a contactless bank card.

Rolling stock
The Brussels Metro is served by 217 carriages of M1-M5 series, manufactured by La Brugeoise et Nivelles, ACEC, Bombardier Transportation, Alstom and CAF and delivered between 1976 and 1999, as well as 21 six-car trainsets of the new M6 series (also known as "Boa"), manufactured by CAF and delivered between 2007 and 2012. A new train type known as M7 series was commissioned on lines 1 and 5 in 2021 and will support full automation.

Future
A new metro line will be created from Brussels-North through Schaerbeek towards Bordet. The plan was finally approved in 2013, aiming to start construction in 2018 and operation in 2022. Eventually, this would be linked up with a new southbound line to Uccle (Héros/Helden), which will not be finished before 2025.
In 2021, the premetro line from Brussels-North to Albert, the route of tram lines 3 and 4, is being upgraded and will be incorporated into the new metro line 3. The present Lemonnier station will be replaced by a new station named after Toots Thielemans under the /.

See also

 Transport in Brussels
 Trams in Brussels
 Brussels RER
 Brusseline (typeface)
 List of Brussels metro and premetro stations
 List of metro systems
 Charleroi Metro

References

Notes

External links

 Brussels Metro Map on Google Maps with Geolocation
 STIB/MIVB official website
 Official Metro map
 To-scale map
 Brussels page on Urbanrail.net
 Photos: Métro de Bruxelles 
 Proposed network :   /  
 Web site with information on future "line 3" 

 
Underground rapid transit in Belgium
Railway lines opened in 1976
1976 establishments in Belgium